Faber Cañaveral Rentería (born August 31, 1988) is a Colombian professional footballer who plays as a midfielder for Santa Rita.

External links
 

1988 births
Living people
Colombian footballers
Colombian expatriate footballers
Categoría Primera A players
Categoría Primera B players
Ascenso MX players
Córdoba F.C. players
Deportivo Cali footballers
Millonarios F.C. players
América de Cali footballers
Uniautónoma F.C. footballers
Envigado F.C. players
Atlético Bucaramanga footballers
Atlético Junior footballers
Correcaminos UAT footballers
Association football midfielders
Colombian expatriate sportspeople in Mexico
Expatriate footballers in Mexico
Footballers from Cali